Westphalian  may refer to:
 The culture or people of the Westphalia region of Germany
 Westphalian language, one of the major dialect groups of West Low German
 Westphalian sovereignty, a concept in international relations
 Westphalian (stage), in geology
 Westphalian ham (Westfälischer Schinken) produced from acorn-fed pigs raised in Westphalia. The resulting meat is dry cured and then smoked over a mixture of beechwood and juniper branches.

Animals 
 Westphalian horse, a warmblood horse bred in the Westphalia region of western Germany
 Westphalian chicken, old hardy landrace of chicken
 Westphalian Dachsbracke, a small, short legged scenthound

Language and nationality disambiguation pages